Dynamic positioning (DP) is a computer-controlled system to automatically maintain a vessel's position and heading by using its own propellers and thrusters. Position reference sensors, combined with wind sensors, motion sensors and gyrocompasses, provide information to the computer pertaining to the vessel's position and the magnitude and direction of environmental forces affecting its position. Examples of vessel types that employ DP include ships and semi-submersible mobile offshore drilling units (MODU), oceanographic research vessels, cable layer ships and cruise ships.

The computer program contains a mathematical model of the vessel that includes information pertaining to the wind and current drag of the vessel and the location of the thrusters. This knowledge, combined with the sensor information, allows the computer to calculate the required steering angle and thruster output for each thruster. This allows operations at sea where mooring or anchoring is not feasible due to deep water, congestion on the sea bottom (pipelines, templates) or other problems.

Dynamic positioning may either be absolute in that the position is locked to a fixed point over the bottom, or relative to a moving object like another ship or an underwater vehicle. One may also position the ship at a favorable angle towards wind, waves and current, called weathervaning.

Dynamic positioning is used by much of the offshore oil industry, for example in the North Sea, Persian Gulf, Gulf of Mexico, West Africa, and off the coast of Brazil. There are currently more than 1800 DP ships.

History
Dynamic positioning began in the 1960s for offshore drilling. With drilling moving into ever deeper waters, Jack-up barges could not be used any more, and anchoring in deep water was not economical.

As part of Project Mohole, in 1961 the drillship Cuss 1 was fitted with four steerable propellers. The Mohole project was attempting to drill to the Moho, which required a solution for deep water drilling. It was possible to keep the ship in position above a well off La Jolla, California, at a depth of 948 meters.

After this, off the coast of Guadalupe, Mexico, five holes were drilled, the deepest at 183 m (601 ft) below the sea floor in 3,500 m (11,700 ft) of water, while maintaining a position within a radius of 180 meters. The ship's position was determined by radar ranging to buoys and sonar ranging from subsea beacons.

Whereas the Cuss 1 was kept in position manually, later in the same year Shell launched the drilling ship Eureka that had an analogue control system interfaced with a taut wire, making it the first true DP ship.

While the first DP ships had analogue controllers and lacked redundancy, since then vast improvements have been made. Besides that, DP nowadays is not only used in the oil industry, but also on various other types of ships. In addition, DP is not limited to maintaining a fixed position any more. One of the possibilities is sailing an exact track, useful for cablelay, pipelay, survey and other tasks.

Comparison between position-keeping options
Other methods of position-keeping are the use of an anchor spread and the use of a jack-up barge. All have their own advantages and disadvantages.

Although all methods have their own advantages, dynamic positioning has made many operations possible that were not feasible before.

The costs are falling due to newer and cheaper technologies, and the advantages are becoming more compelling as offshore work enters ever deeper water and the environment (coral) is given more respect. With container operations, crowded ports can be made more efficient by quicker and more accurate berthing techniques. Cruise ship operations benefit from faster berthing and non-anchored "moorings" off beaches or inaccessible ports.

Applications

Important applications include:
Servicing Aids to Navigation (ATON)
Cable-laying
Crane vessels
Cruise ships
Diving support vessels
Dredging
Drillships
Floating production storage and offloading units (FPSOs)
Flotels
Landing platform docks
Maritime research
Mine sweepers
Pipe-laying ship
Platform supply vessels
Rock dumping
Sea Launch
Sea-based X-band radar
Shuttle tankers
Survey ships

Scope 
A ship can be considered to have six degrees of freedom in its motion, i.e., it can move in any of six axes.

Three of these involve translation:
surge (forward/astern)
sway (starboard/port)
heave (up/down)

and the other three rotation:
roll (rotation about surge axis)
pitch (rotation about sway axis)
yaw (rotation about heave axis)

Dynamic positioning is concerned primarily with control of the ship in the horizontal plane, i.e., the three axes: surge, sway and yaw.

Requirements 
A ship that is to be used for DP requires:
to maintain position and heading, first of all the position and heading need to be known.
a control computer to calculate the required control actions to maintain position and correct for position errors.
thrust elements to apply forces to the ship as demanded by the control system.

For most applications, the position reference systems and thrust elements must be carefully considered when designing a DP ship. In particular, for good control of position in adverse weather, the thrust capability of the ship in three axes must be adequate.

Maintaining a fixed position is particularly difficult in polar conditions because ice forces can change rapidly. Ship-borne ice detection and mitigation is not sufficiently developed to predict these forces, but may be preferable to sensors placed by helicopter.

Positioning systems

There are several means to determine a ship's position at sea. Most traditional methods used for ships navigation are not accurate enough for some modern requirements. For that reason, several positioning systems have been developed during the past decades. Producers of DP systems are: Marine Technologies LLC, Kongsberg Maritime, Navis Engineering Oy, GE, DCNS, Wärtsilä (ex L-3), MT-div.Chouest, Rolls-Royce plc, Praxis Automation Technology, Brunvoll AS. The applications and availability depends on the type of work and water depth. The most common Position reference/Measuring systems /Equipment (PRS/PME) are:

DGPS, Differential GPS. The position obtained by GPS is not accurate enough for use by DP. The position is improved by use of a fixed ground-based reference station (differential station) that compares the GPS position to the known position of the station. The correction is sent to the DGPS receiver by long wave radio frequency. For use in DP an even higher accuracy and reliability is needed. Companies such as Veripos, Fugro or C-Nav supply differential signals via satellite, enabling the combination of several differential stations. The advantage of DGPS is that it is almost always available. Disadvantages include degradation of the signal by ionospheric or atmospheric disturbances, blockage of satellites by cranes or structures and deterioration of the signal at high altitudes. There are also systems installed on vessels that use various Augmentation systems, as well as combining GPS position with GLONASS.
Acoustics. This system consists of one or more transponders placed on the seabed and a transducer placed in the ship's hull. The transducer sends an acoustic signal (by means of piezoelectric elements) to the transponder, which is triggered to reply. As the velocity of sound through water is known (preferably a soundprofile is taken regularly), the distance is known. Because there are many elements on the transducer, the direction of the signal from the transponder can be determined. Now the position of the ship relative to the transponder can be calculated. Disadvantages are the vulnerability to noise by thrusters or other acoustic systems. The use is limited in shallow waters because of ray bending that occurs when sound travels through water horizontally. Three types of HPR systems are commonly used:
Ultra- or super- short base line, USBL or SSBL. This works as described above. Because the angle to the transponder is measured, a correction needs to be made for the ship's roll and pitch. These are determined by Motion Reference Units. Because of the nature of angle measurement, the accuracy deteriorates with increasing water depth.
Long base line, LBL. This consists of an array of at least three transponders. The initial position of the transponders is determined by USBL and/ or by measuring the baselines between the transponders. Once that is done, only the ranges to the transponders need to be measured to determine a relative position. The position should theoretically be located at the intersection of imaginary spheres, one around each transponder, with a radius equal to the time between transmission and reception multiplied by the speed of sound through water. Because angle measurement is not necessary, the accuracy in large water depths is better than USBL.
Short baseline, SBL. This works with an array of transducers in the ship's hull. These determine their position to a transponder, so a solution is found in the same way as with LBL. As the array is located on the ship, it needs to be corrected for roll and pitch.
Riser Angle Monitoring. On drillships, riser angle monitoring can be fed into the DP system. It may be an electrical inclinometer or based on USBL, where a riser angle monitoring transponder is fitted to the riser and a remote inclinometer unit is installed on the Blow Out Preventer (BOP) and interrogated through the ship's HPR.

Light taut wire, LTW or LWTW. The oldest position reference system used for DP is still very accurate in relatively shallow water. A clumpweight is lowered to the seabed. By measuring the amount of wire paid out and the angle of the wire by a gimbal head, the relative position can be calculated. Care should be taken not to let the wire angle become too large to avoid dragging. For deeper water the system is less favourable, as current will curve the wire. There are however systems that counteract this with a gimbal head on the clumpweight. Horizontal LTW's are also used when operating close to a structure. Objects falling on the wire are a risk here.
Fanbeam and CyScan. These are laser based position reference systems. They are very straightforward system, as only a prism cluster or tape target needs to be installed on a nearby structure or ship. Risks are the system locking on other reflecting objects and blocking of the signal. However, the Cyscan Absolute Signature which was released in 2017 was launched to address this issue. It is able to engage in an active lock with the Absolute Signature prism which reduces the chance of a wrong target being tracked. Range depends on the weather, but is typically more than 500 meters. New advancement from Guidance Marine led to the development of the SceneScan sensor which is a target-less laser PRS leveraging on the SLAM algorithm.
Artemis. A radar-based system. A unit is placed on a fixed station (FPSO) and the unit on board the mobile station locks on to it to report the range and bearing. The operationalrange is in excess of 4 kilometers. Advantage is the reliable, all-weather performance. Disadvantage is that the unit is rather heavy and costly. Current version is the Artemis Mk6.
DARPS, Differential, Absolute and Relative Positioning System. Commonly used on shuttle tankers while loading from a FPSO. Both will have a GPS receiver. As the errors are the same for the both of them, the signal does not need to be corrected. The position from the FPSO is transmitted to the shuttle tanker, so a range and bearing can be calculated and fed into the DP system.
RADius and RadaScan. These are radar based systems; while the RADius has no moving parts, the RadaScan has a rotating antenna under the dome. Guidance Marine has improved the miniRadaScan with the RadaScan View which has an added advantage of radar back-scatter. This enhanced the DPO's situational awareness. These systems usually have responders which are active targets that send the signal back to the sensor to report the range and bearing. The range is typically up to 600 meters.
Inertial navigation is used in combination with any of the above reference systems, but typically with gnss (Global Navigation Satellite System) and Hydroacoustics (USBL, LBL, or SBL).

Heading systems
Gyrocompasses are normally used to determine heading.

More advanced methods are:
Ring-Laser gyroscopes
Fibre optic gyroscopes
Seapath, a combination of GPS and inertial sensors.

Other sensors
Besides position and heading, other variables are fed into the DP system through sensors:
Motion reference units, vertical reference units or vertical reference sensors, VRUs or MRUs or VRSs, determine the ship's roll, pitch and heave.
Wind sensors are fed into the DP system feedforward, so the system can anticipate wind gusts before the ship is blown off position.
Draught sensors, since a change of draught influences the effect of wind and current on the hull.
Other sensors depend on the kind of ship. A pipelay ship may measure the force needed to pull on the pipe, large crane vessels will have sensors to determine the cranes position, as this changes the wind model, enabling the calculation of a more accurate model (see Control systems).
Some external forces are not directly measured. In these cases, the offset force is deduced over a period of time, allowing an average value of compensating thrust to be applied. All forces not attributable to direct measurement are labeled "current", as this is what they are assumed to be, but in reality this is a combination of current, waves, swell, and any errors in the system. As is traditional in the maritime industry, DP "current" is always recorded in the direction that it is flowing towards.

Control systems

In the beginning PID controllers were used and today are still used in the simpler DP systems. But modern controllers use a mathematical model of the ship that is based on a hydrodynamic and aerodynamic description concerning some of the ship's characteristics such as mass and drag. Of course, this model is not entirely correct. The ship's position and heading are fed into the system and compared with the prediction made by the model. This difference is used to update the model by using Kalman filtering technique. For this reason, the model also has input from the wind sensors and feedback from the thrusters. This method even allows not having input from any PRS for some time, depending on the quality of the model and the weather. This process is known as dead reckoning.

The accuracy and precision of the different PRSs is not the same. While a DGPS has a high accuracy and precision, a USBL can have a much lower precision. For this reason, the PRS's are weighted. Based on variance a PRS receives a weight between 0 and 1.

Power and propulsion systems

To maintain position azimuth thrusters (electric, L-drive or Z-drive) bow thrusters, stern thrusters, water jets, rudders and propellers are used. DP ships are usually at least partially diesel-electric, as this allows a more flexible set-up and is better able to handle the large changes in power demand, typical for DP operations. These fluctuations may be suitable for hybrid operation. An LNG-powered platform supply vessel started operation in 2016 with a 653 kWh/1600 kW battery acting as spinning reserve during DP2, saving 15-30% fuel. The 154-meter North Sea Giant has combined 3 powerpacks, switchboards and 2 MWh batteries to operate in DP3 using only one engine, keeping the engine load between 60% and 80%.

The set-up depends on the DP class of the ship. A Class 1 can be relatively simple, whereas the system of a Class 3 ship is quite complex. On Class 2 and 3 ships, all computers and reference systems should be powered through a UPS.

International Maritime Organization class requirements
Based on IMO (International Maritime Organization) publication 645 the Classification Societies have issued rules for Dynamic Positioned Ships described as Class 1, Class 2 and Class 3.

Equipment Class 1 has no redundancy.Loss of position may occur in the event of a single fault.
Equipment Class 2 has redundancy so that no single fault in an active system will cause the system to fail.Loss of position should not occur from a single fault of an active component or system such as generators, thruster, switchboards, remote controlled valves etc., but may occur after failure of a static component such as cables, pipes, manual valves etc.
Equipment Class 3 which also has to withstand fire or flood in any one compartment without the system failing.Loss of position should not occur from any single failure including a completely burnt fire sub division or flooded watertight compartment.

Classification Societies have their own Class notations:

DNV rules 2011 Pt6 Ch7 introduced "DPS" series of classification to compete with ABS "DPS" series.

Norwegian Maritime Authority Guidelines
Where IMO leaves the decision of which class applies to what kind of operation to the operator of the DP ship and its client, the Norwegian Maritime Authority(NMA) has specified what Class should be used in regard to the risk of an operation. In the NMA Guidelines and Notes No. 28, enclosure A four classes are defined:

Class 0 Operations where loss of position keeping capability is not considered to endanger human lives, or cause damage.
Class 1 Operations where loss of position keeping capability may cause damage or pollution of small consequence.
Class 2 Operations where loss of position keeping capability may cause personnel injury, pollution, or damage with large economic consequences.
Class 3 Operations where loss of position keeping capability may cause fatal accidents, or severe pollution or damage with major economic consequences.

Based on this the type of ship is specified for each operation:
Class 1 DP units with equipment class 1 should be used during operations where loss of position is not considered to endanger human lives, cause significant damage or cause more than minimal pollution.
Class 2 DP units with equipment class 2 should be used during operations where loss of position could cause personnel injury, pollution or damage with great economic consequences.
Class 3 DP units with equipment class 3 should be used during operations where loss of position could cause fatal accidents, severe pollution or damage with major economic consequences.

Failure 
Loss of position, also known as runoff, can be a threat to safe operations and the environment, including possible loss of life, injury, damage to property or the environment, and loss of reputation and time. Incident records indicate that even vessels with redundant dynamic positioning systems are subject to occasional loss of position, which can be due to human error, procedural failure, dynamic positioning system failures, or bad design. 

Dynamic positioning failure results in an inability to maintain position or heading control, and can be a drift off caused by insufficient thrust, or a drive off caused by inappropriate thrust.

Risk of runoff
Consequences – for drilling, diving and other operations. Injury to divers is possible, Damage to diving equipment including cutting of diver's umbilical has occurred.
Mitigation – dealing with a runoff; training and competence; emergency drills.

Dynamic positioning alarm and runout response for bell divers
Code amber /Yellow alert – Divers return to the bell immediately, stow umbilicals, and stand by for further developments and instructions.
Code red – Divers return to the bell without delaying to retrieve tools and prepare for immediate ascent. The bell can not be recovered until the umbilicals have been safely stowed.
The basic response with a closed bell is similar to wet bell, but after stowing umbilicals, the hatch will be sealed so that internal pressure can be retained. The bell will be recovered as rapidly as possible in a red alert, and may be recovered if there is doubt that a yellow alert will be downgraded.

Redundancy
Redundancy is the ability to withstand, while on DP mode, the loss of equipment which is online, without losing position or heading. A single failure can be, amongst others:
Thruster failure
Generator (power supply) failure
Power bus failure (when generators are combined on one power bus)
Control computer failure
Position reference system failure
Reference system failure

For certain operations redundancy is not required. For instance, if a survey ship loses its DP capability, there is normally no risk of damage or injuries. These operations will normally be done in Class 1.

For other operations, such as diving and heavy lifting, there is a risk of damage or injuries. Depending on the risk, the operation is done in Class 2 or 3. This means at least three Position reference systems should be selected. This allows the principle of voting logic, so the failing PRS can be found. For this reason, there are also three DP control computers, three gyrocompasses, three MRU's and three wind sensors on Class 3 ships. If a single fault occurs that jeopardizes the redundancy, i.e., failing of a thruster, generator or a PRS, and this cannot be resolved immediately, the operation should be abandoned as quickly as possible.

To have sufficient redundancy, enough generators and thrusters should be on-line so the failure of one does not result in a loss of position. This is left to the judgment of the DP operator. For Class 2 and Class 3 a Consequence Analysis should be incorporated in the system to assist the DPO in this process.

The redundancy of a DP ship should be judged by a failure mode and effects analysis (FMEA) study and proved by FMEA trials. Besides that, annual trials are done and normally DP function tests are completed prior to each project.

DP operator
The DP operator (DPO) judges whether there is enough redundancy available at any given moment of the operation. IMO issued MSC/Circ.738 (Guidelines for dynamic positioning system (DP) operator training) on 24-06-1996. This refers to IMCA (International Marine Contractors Association) M 117 as acceptable standard.

To qualify as a DP operator the following path should be followed:
a DP Induction course + On-line Examination
a minimum of 60 days seagoing DP familiarisation
a DP Advanced course + On-line Examination
a minimum of 60 days watchkeeping on a DP ship
a statement of suitability by the master of a DP ship

When the watchkeeping is done on a Class 1 DP ship, a limited certificate will be issued; otherwise a full certificate will be issued.

The DP training and certification scheme is operated by The Nautical Institute (NI). The NI issue logbooks to trainees, they accredit training centres and control the issuance of certification.

With ever more DP ships and with increasing manpower demands, the position of DPO is gaining increasing prominence. This shifting landscape led to the creation of The International Dynamic Positioning Operators Association (IDPOA) in 2009. www.dpoperators.org

IDPOA membership is made up of certified DPO's who qualify for fellowship (fDPO), while Members (mDPO) are those with DP experience or who may already be working within the DP certification scheme.

International Marine Contractors Association
The International Marine Contractors Association was formed in April 1995 from the amalgamation of the Dynamic Positioning Vessel Owners Association, founded in 1990, and the International Association of Offshore Diving Contractors, founded in 1972.

While it started with the collection and analysis of DP Incidents, since then it has produced publications on different subjects to improve standards for DP systems. It also works with IMO and other regulatory bodies.

Marine Technology Society Dynamic Positioning Committee 
The Marine Technology Society Dynamic Positioning (DP) Committee's mission is to facilitate incident free DP operations through sharing of knowledge. This committee of dedicated volunteers delivers value to the DP community of vessel owners, operators, Marine Class Societies, engineers and regulators through an annual DP Conference, topical workshops and an extensive set of Guidance Documents covering DP Design Philosophy, DP Operations and Professional Development of DP Personnel. In addition, a growing set of unique documents called TECHOP's address specific topics of significant interest and impact. Conference papers are available for download by the public, providing the most comprehensive single source of DP industry technical papers available anywhere.

The DP Guidance documents published by the MTS DP Committee are designed to disseminate the knowledge, methods and unique tools to aid the DP community in achieving incident free DP operations. The documents are free to download from the Committee's website http://dynamic-positioning.com

See also 
 

Last Breath (2019 film) – 2019 documentary about a dynamic positioning failure that led to a serious accident, a severed umbilical, and the near loss of a diver

References

Sources

External links

List of all offshore vessels
IMO, International Maritime Organization
Introduction to Dynamic Positioning by the International Marine Contractors Association (IMCA)
NMD, Norwegian Maritime Directorate
OPL Oilfield Seamanship Series - Volume 9: Dynamic Positioning - 2nd Edition by David Bray
NI, The Nautical Institute
The Dynamic Positioning Committee of The Marine Technology Society
The International Dynamic Positioning Operators Association (IDPOA)

Navigational equipment
Offshore engineering
Geopositioning